David Zimmerman may refer to:
David Zimmerman (photographer) (1955–)
David H. Zimmerman (politician, 1956–)
David Zimmerman (writer)